An Acoustic Evening With is a live album by Ani DiFranco. It was recorded Live in Renton, Washington on July 14, 1994 and released sometime in 1994.

Track listing

Both Hands – 3:26
Buildings and Bridges – 3:18
Pick Yer Nose – 3:38
Coming Up – 2:30
Willing to Fight – 4:08
God's Country – 2:48
Worthy – 4:10
4 July – 5:10
Letter to a John – 3:48
Sorry I Am – 4:29
Cradle and All – 4:14
Asking Too Much – 3:25
My I.Q. – 1:22
What If No One's Watching – 3:11
In or Out – 3:04

Personnel
Ani DiFranco – guitar, vocals

References

Ani DiFranco live albums
1994 live albums